Merton Jennings Batchelder (March 5, 1896 – November 26, 1975) was a United States Marine Corps brigadier general who served as commanding officer of the 25th Marine Regiment and later as chief of staff of the 4th Marine Division during World War II.

Early career

Batchelder was born on March 5, 1896, in New Bedford, Massachusetts, and attended local public schools. During World War I, he enlisted in the Marine Corps as private in June 1917. After finishing of the Recruit Training, Batchelder was sent to Virgin Islands in September 1917, where he was promoted to the rank of sergeant and decorated with Marine Corps Good Conduct Medal.

He was sent to France within 13th Marine Regiment. However, Batchelder didn't participate in the combat duties and was stationed for the rest of the war in the city of Brest. During his service there, he was commissioned second lieutenant in August 1918. Batchelder returned to the United States in July 1919 and was assigned to the Marine Barracks Quantico, Virginia. He subsequently sailed for Santo Domingo, Dominican Republic as a member of the Second Brigade of Marines in December 1919. Batchelder was promoted to the rank of first lieutenant in March 1921.

World War II

Batchelder reported at Camp Pendleton, California, in August 1943, where new 4th Marine Division was activated under the command of Major General Harry Schmidt. He was appointed division personnel officer at the same time and was responsible for the essential administrative liaison between the subordinate units and the headquarters.

He sailed with the division to the Pacific in January 1944 and participated in the subsequent Battle of Kwajalein. Batchelder was appointed commanding officer of the 25th Marine Regiment in April 1944, relieving Colonel Samuel C. Cumming, who was promoted and appointed assistant division commander. He subsequently commanded the regiment during the Saipan operation.

During the following Battle of Tinian at the end of July 1944, Batchelder landed on the beachhead with first waves under heavy enemy fire and was able to repel counterattacks and establish defense line. For his leadership and gallantry in action, he was decorated with the Navy Cross. Batchelder also received the Navy Presidential Unit Citation.

Navy Cross citation

His official Navy Cross citation reads follows:

Batchelder remained in command of the regiment until 31 October 1944, when he was appointed chief of staff of 4th Marine Division. He succeeded Colonel Matthew C. Horner at this post. He served in this capacity during the Battle of Iwo Jima in February 1945 and was decorated with the Bronze Star Medal with Combat "V" for his service and also another Navy Presidential Unit Citation.

Postwar career

Batchelder served in this capacity until 9 April 1945, when he was ordered back to the United States. He was subsequently assigned to the Headquarters Marine Corps, Washington, D.C., where he was appointed Chief of Detail Branch in June 1945. Batchelder remained at headquarters and was then appointed assistant director of personnel. He served in this capacity until 30 June 1949, when he retired from the Marine Corps. Batchelder was advanced to the rank of brigadier general for having been specially commended in combat.

Batchelder died on November 26, 1975, and is buried at Arlington National Cemetery, Virginia, together with his wife Katherine. Together they had son, Merton J. Batchelder (1929–2013), USNA of 1951 and captain in the Marine Corps.

Decorations

References

1896 births
1975 deaths
People from New Bedford, Massachusetts
United States Marine Corps personnel of World War II
United States Marine Corps personnel of World War I
American military personnel of the Banana Wars
United States Marines
United States Marine Corps generals
Recipients of the Navy Cross (United States)
Burials at Arlington National Cemetery
Military personnel from Massachusetts